A list of the various regions of Ukraine and/or inhabited by Ukrainians and their ancestors throughout history.

Main historical regions

Traditional regions 
The traditional names of the regions of Ukraine are important geographic, historical, and ethnographic identifiers.
  Over-Dnieper Ukraine, Great Ukraine
  Land of Kyiv
 Right-bank Ukraine (east of Zhytomyr Oblast, Kyiv Oblast, Cherkasy Oblast), Central Ukraine
 Polesia, Land of Turov (north of Kyiv Oblast, east of Brest Oblast, west of Gomel Oblast), Northern Ukraine
 Land of Pereyaslav (predominantly Poltava Oblast and east of Kyiv Oblast), southern part of Left-bank Ukraine, Little Russia, Central Ukraine
  Land of Chernihiv (predominantly Chernihiv Oblast, west of Bryansk Oblast, east of Gomel Oblast), northern part of Left-bank Ukraine, Little Russia, Northern Ukraine
 Severia (Sumy Oblast, Kharkiv Oblast, Kursk Oblast, Belgorod Oblast)
 Sloboda Ukraine (mostly Kharkiv Oblast)
  Ruthenia, Kingdom of Rus, Western Ukraine, Western Oblast, Liitle Poland
  Volhynia (Volyn Oblast, Rivne Oblast, west of Zhytomyr Oblast, north of Ternopil Oblast, north of Khmelnytsky Oblast), former principality
 Chełm, Belz, San River, Przemyśl (east of Podkarpackie Voivodeship and Lublin Voivodeship), former principality and a constituent land of Ruthenia
 Berestia (west of Brest Oblast, south of Podlaskie Voivodeship)
  Galicia (Lviv Oblast, Ivano-Frankivsk Oblast, Ternopil Oblast)
Red Ruthenia
 Prykarpattia (Boikos and Lemkos, collectively Rusyns)
 Pokuttia (Hutsuls)
  Podolia (Khmelnytsky Oblast, Vinnytsia Oblast, north of Odessa Oblast, west of Kirovohrad Oblast), Little Poland
  Zaporizhzhia (Dnipropetrovsk Oblast, east of Kirovohrad Oblast), New Serbia, Central Ukraine
 Pontic steppe, Wild Fields, New Russia
 Donbas ("Donets Basin") (Donetsk Oblast, Luhanks Oblast), also known as Cuman Land, Slavo-Serbia, Eastern Ukraine
 Azov Littoral (Zaporizhzhia Oblast, south of Donetsk Oblast, southwest of Rostov Oblast)
 Black Sea Littoral, Southern Ukraine
 Over-Buh, Yedisan, Transnistria (Odessa Oblast, Mykolaiv Oblast)
 Bugeac (Budzhak) (southwest of Odessa Oblast)
 Tavria (Kherson Oblast)
 Crimea (Krym), also known as Tavria, Taurida
  Transcarpathia / Carpathian Ruthenia, Subcarpathian Rus, Carpatho-Ukraine and many others
 Maramureș
 Northern Bukovina (Chernivtsi Oblast)

Regions historically inhabited by Ukrainians (mostly with other nations), which are partly or wholly outside modern Ukraine:
 Kuban granted to Black Sea Cossacks colonization from the Russian government during the Russian-Circassian War
 Northern Caucasus (also called Pink Ukraine)
 Volga Region (around Saratov, called Yellow Ukraine)
 Siberia (city of Omsk, Grey Ukraine)
 Russian Far East (see Green Ukraine)

Regions of Ukraine

Geopolitical, historical, and cultural factors play a role in assigning different areas of Ukraine to semi-official regions. The map on the right shows the approximate locations of some broad-brush regions. The terms "Central Ukraine", "Eastern Ukraine", "Southern Ukraine", and "Western Ukraine" occur in common usage. There is no clear definition of the boundaries of such regions, but rather a general reference. Lists of what may constitute such regions might include:

 Central Ukraine, a more vague term, often denotes what is not included in Western or South-Eastern definitions.
 Eastern Ukraine may mean either the Don basin, Sloboda Ukraine, continental Taurida regions etc.
 Southern Ukraine often includes the whole Taurida, the Kryvyi Rih basin, and the regions of Mykolayiv and Odessa oblasts. Alternatively it may include the Don basin, in particularly the adjacent land to the Azov Sea.
 Western Ukraine may mean either the historic region of Galicia, or may also include Volhynia, Podolia, Transcarpathia, and/or Bukovina.

Other terms are rarely used – such as "South-western Ukraine", which can denote either Transcarpathia, or Budjak. Sometimes the term "South-eastern Ukraine" is used to define both regions of the Southern and Eastern Ukraine. Due to the shape of the country, in narrow definition, term "Northern Ukraine" is often used to denote either the bulge of Chernihiv/Sumy oblasts or, in broader terms, the whole of Polesia. "North-western Ukraine" almost exclusively refers to the historic region of Volhynia. This makes the term "North-eastern Ukraine" rarest of them all – it is either used as synonym for the narrow definition of Northern Ukraine, or as synonym for Sloboda Ukraine (particularly Sumy Oblast).

Historical Ukrainian states 

 Kievan Rus (a state of Early East Slavs), (879–1240)
 Kingdom of Galicia–Volhynia (1199–1349)
 Cossack Hetmanate (1649–1764)
 Central Rada of the Ukrainian People's Republic (1917–1918)
 Ukrainian People's Republic of Soviets (1917–1918)
 Odesa Soviet Republic (1918)
 Donetsk–Krivoy Rog Soviet Republic (1918)
 Ukrainian Soviet Republic (1918)
 Hetmanate of the Ukrainian State (1918)
 West Ukrainian People's Republic (1918–1919)
 Directorate of the Ukrainian People's Republic (1918–1920)
 Ukrainian Soviet Socialist Republic (1919–1991)
 Galician Soviet Socialist Republic (1920)
 Carpatho-Ukraine (1938–1939)
 Ukrainian national government (1941)
 Reichskommissariat Ukraine (1941-1944)
 Ukraine (1991–present)

See also

 Geography of Ukraine
 ISO 3166-2:UA
 List of places named after people (Ukraine)

References 

 Paul Robert Magosci, Ukraine: A Historical Atlas, 1985.  University of Toronto Press, Toronto.  

 
Historical regions
Ukraine
Ukrainian genealogy
Historical regions